The Asia/Oceania Zone was one of three zones of regional competition in the 2002 Fed Cup.

Group I
Venue: Guangzhou, China (outdoor hard) 
Date: 4–9 March

The eleven teams were divided into two pools of five and six teams. The teams that finished first and second in the pools played-off to determine which team would partake in the World Group Play-offs. The two nations coming last in the pools were relegated to Group II for 2002.

Pools

Play-offs

  and  advanced to 2002 World Group Play-offs.
  and  relegated to Group II in 2003.

Group II
Venue: Guangzhou, China (outdoor hard) 
Date: 4–8 March

The five teams played in one pool of five, with the two teams placing first and second in the pool advancing to Group I for 2003.

Pool

  and  advanced to Group I for 2003.

See also
Fed Cup structure

References

 Fed Cup Profile, Indonesia
 Fed Cup Profile, South Korea
 Fed Cup Profile, Chinese Taipei
 Fed Cup Profile, New Zealand
 Fed Cup Profile, China
 Fed Cup Profile, Japan
 Fed Cup Profile, Thailand
 Fed Cup Profile, Hong Kong
 Fed Cup Profile, Uzbekistan
 Fed Cup Profile, Malaysia
 Fed Cup Profile, Kazakhstan
 Fed Cup Profile, Pacific Oceania
 Fed Cup Profile, Singapore

External links
 Fed Cup website

 
Asia Oceania
Sports competitions in Guangzhou
Tennis tournaments in China